Dichloroarcyriaflavin A synthase is an enzyme with systematic name dichlorochromopyrrolate,NADH:oxygen 2,5-oxidoreductase (dichloroarcyriaflavin A-forming). This enzyme catalyses the following chemical reaction

 dichlorochromopyrrolate + 4 O2 + 4 NADH + 4 H+  dichloroarcyriaflavin A + 2 CO2 + 6 H2O + 4 NAD+

RebP is an NAD-dependent cytochrome P450 oxygenase that performs an aryl-aryl bond formation

References

External links 
 

EC 1.13.12